The Mollhausen Mountains are found in the Mojave Desert of California in the United States. The small range is found south of Interstate 15 southwest of the town of Baker. The mountains are located at the northwestern edge of the Devils Playground and south of the Soda Mountains.

References

Mojave National Preserve
Mountain ranges of the Mojave Desert
Mountain ranges of San Bernardino County, California